Chanpatia is a city Nagar Panchayat situated on the bank of the Burhi Gandak River is the administrative headquarter of Chanpatia block in Paschim Champaran district near the Indo-Nepal border, 18 km from District headquarter Bettiah, 242 km north-west of capital city Patna in the state of Bihar, India. Chanpatia is famous for tasty Marcha Ka chura (flattened rice), Basmati rice and the famous Handi kabab.

Majority of population depends on agriculture. There are many small scale industries is present. Chanpatia is now growing at very high speed. New startup zone called Chanpatia startup zone was initiated during lockdown providing employment to many needy persons. Readymade clothes from this startup zones are highly demanding worldwide.

Demographics
 India census, Chanpatia had a population of 34,098. Males constitute 52% of the population and females 48%. Chanpatia has an average literacy rate of 49%, lower than the national average of 59.5%; with male literacy of 58% and female literacy of 39%. 19% of the population is under 6 years of age. Major crops grown in this area are sugarcane, wheat and rice.

Politics

It is part of Chanpatia Assembly constituency.

Local Language

Hindi is the official language and Bhojpuri is the regional language use by the people of Chanpatia.

Transportation
Chanpatia is well connected to many cities like Patna, Lucknow, Muzaffarpur, Kolkata, New Delhi, and Mumbai through roadways and railways. The railway station is Chanpatia railway station situated on Muzaffarpur–Gorakhpur main line. Other nearest railway station from is Bettiah railway station and Narkatiaganj Junction railway station

Chanpatia doesn't have to airport.

References

Cities and towns in West Champaran district